Gripe may refer to:

 Arena Gripe, an indoor sporting arena located in Split, Croatia
 Gripe water, a product sold to relieve colic and other gastrointestinal ailments and discomforts of infants
 Gripe site, a type of website devoted to the critique and or mockery of a person, place, politician, corporation, or institution
 Gripe (tool), a simple form of clamp used in building a clinker boat
 GripeO, an online complaint portal based in Buffalo, New York

 People
 Maria Gripe (aka Maja Stina Walter, 1923–2007), a Swedish author of books for children and young adults
 Ragnar Gripe (1883–1942), a Swedish sailor who competed in the 1912 Summer Olympics